In relational database theory, an embedded dependency (ED) is a certain kind of constraint on a relational database. It is the most general type of constraint used in practice, including both tuple-generating dependencies and equality-generating dependencies. Embedded dependencies can express functional dependencies, join dependencies, multivalued dependencies, inclusion dependencies, foreign key dependencies, and many more besides.

An algorithm known as the chase takes as input an instance that may or may not satisfy a set of EDs, and, if it terminates (which is a priori undecidable), output an instance that does satisfy the EDs.

Definition 
An embedded dependency (ED) is a sentence in first-order logic of the form:

A relational atom has the form  and an equality atom has the form , where each of the terms  are variables or constants.

Restrictions 
In literature there are many common restrictions on embedded dependencies, among with:
 full (or universal) dependencies, which are the ones without existentially-quantified variables
 tuple-generating dependencies (TGDs)
 equality-generating dependencies (EGDs)
 single-head (or 1-head) dependencies, which have only one atom in the head
 unirelational dependencies, in which only one relation symbol occurs

Every ED is equivalent to an EGD and a TGD.

Extensions 
A common extension of embedded dependencies are disjunctive embedded dependencies (DED), which can be defined as follows:

Disjunctive embedded dependencies are more expressive than simple embedded dependencies, because DEDs in general can not be simulated using one or more EDs.
An even more expressive constraint is the disjunctive embedded dependency with inequalities (indicated with DED), in which every  may contain also inequality atoms.

All the restriction above can be applied also to disjunctive embedded dependencies. Beside them, DEDs can also be seen as a generalization of disjunctive tuple-generating dependencies and disjunctive equality-generating dependencies.

References

Further reading 
 
 Serge Abiteboul, Richard B. Hull, Victor Vianu: Foundations of Databases. Addison-Wesley, 1995.
 

Database theory
Logic